An Yu-jin (born September 1, 2003), better known mononymously as Yujin, is a South Korean singer. She is the leader of the South Korean girl group Ive under Starship Entertainment. Yujin rose to prominence after finishing fifth on Mnet's girl group survival show Produce 48, which made her debut as a member of the girl group Iz*One, active from 2018 to 2021.

Early life
An was born on September 1, 2003. She attended School of Performing Arts Seoul. Off the Record revealed in 2019 that she had dropped out of school to focus on her idol life and Iz*One activities and she would be home-schooled.

Career

2018–present: Produce 48, Iz*One, solo activities

From June 15 to August 31, 2018, An represented Starship Entertainment alongside Jang Won-young and Cho Ka-hyeon on reality girl group survival show Produce 48. She eventually placed fifth and debuted with Iz*One. The group's debut extended play (EP) Color*Iz was released on October 29, 2018, with "La Vie en Rose" serving as its lead single.

A few months after her debut with Iz*One, An participated in the singing competition, King of Mask Singer. She was the youngest competitor in the show's history (15 years and 99 days old). As of December 11, 2020, she was still the youngest female contestant.

It was announced that An will become a cast member for MBC’s My Little Television V2, alongside Kim Gu-ra. However, she was removed from the cast starting from episode 34 due to the Mnet vote manipulation investigation.

From March 2021 to March 2022, An acted as the MC of Inkigayo alongside NCT's Sungchan and Treasure's Jihoon.

After Iz*One disbanded in April 2021, she and groupmate Wonyoung returned to be Starship trainees.

On November 1, 2021, Starship Entertainment announced that An and Wonyoung will debut their new girl group Ive on December 1, 2021. It is their first group since they debuted Cravity in April 2020 and their first girl group since WJSN's debut in February 2016. She, along with Wonyoung, became the first two members revealed to the group. Later the group debuted with their first single album, Eleven.

In 2022, An was a panelist on season 2 of the "military survival" reality show Steel Troops. Also in 2022, An led the tvN variety show Earth Arcade, alongside fellow castmates Oh My Girl's Mimi, Lee Young-ji, and Lee Eun-ji.

Endorsements
An has appeared as an actress in commercials and music videos, most notably in an Acuvue Vita commercial. In December 2022, An was announced as the brand ambassador for Korean makeup brand Clio Cosmetics. In January 2023, An was selected as the brand ambassador for Italian luxury fashion house Fendi.

Discography

Promotional singles

Filmography

Television shows

Hosting

Music videos

Music videos appearances

Notes

References

External links

2003 births
Living people
South Korean female idols
South Korean women pop singers
21st-century South Korean women singers
Ive (group) members
South Korean dance musicians
Produce 48 contestants
Starship Entertainment artists
Iz*One members
People from Daejeon
Sunheung An clan

Reality show winners
Japanese-language singers of South Korea